Georgios Pozidis (20 February 1956 – 1 August 2019) was a Greek wrestler. He competed at the 1980 Summer Olympics and the 1984 Summer Olympics.

References

1956 births
2019 deaths
Greek male sport wrestlers
Olympic wrestlers of Greece
Wrestlers at the 1980 Summer Olympics
Wrestlers at the 1984 Summer Olympics
Place of birth missing